Ministro Portales was a  purchased by Chile in 1974 from the United States that had been upgraded to FRAM II. Between 1975 and 1976, the vessel was refitted with an extension on the flight deck for Alouette-III Helicopters.

 Ministro Portales participated in the counteractive measures to the Operation Soberanía during the Beagle conflict in 1978. In this period, all the Chilean navy ships were camouflaged.

The vessel served the navy of Chile until it was taken off active duty and towed from Talcahuano to Puerto Williams, arriving at the wharf on 18 September 1991. There, it was a static support vessel for the local torpedo boat fleet until their replacement by missile boats.

On 11 November 1998, Ministro Portales was used as a target and sunk during a practice exercise.

External links
 navsource.org: USS Douglas H. Fox
 armada.cl: Destructor Ministro Portales (In Spanish)

 

Ships built in Seattle
1944 ships
Allen M. Sumner-class destroyers of the Chilean Navy
Ships sunk as targets
Maritime incidents in 1998